Eldr is a men’s wear brand from Aarhus, Denmark specializing in functional apparel inspired by outdoor and workwear.

ELDR may refer to:

 European Liberal Democrat and Reform Party, the former name of the Alliance of Liberals and Democrats for Europe Party
 European Liberal Democrat and Reform Party (European Parliament group), from 1994 to 2004